Didgori generally refers to:

 Battle of Didgori, a conflict between the Kingdom of Georgia and a Muslim coalition at Didgori near Tbilisi in August 1121
 Mount Didgori, Mount Didgori, mountain situated west of Tbilisi

Didgori series of Georgian armoured personnel carriers:
 Didgori-1
 Didgori-2
 Didgori-3
 Didgori Medevac